Looney Ricks Kiss is a Memphis-based full-service architecture firm founded in 1983 by Carson Looney, FAIA, Frank Ricks, FAIA, and Richard Kiss, AIA. In addition to architecture, its services include planning, interior architecture and environmental graphic design. LRK is known for a variety of projects including the Urban Land Institute Award of Excellence honored AutoZone Park and Harbor Town.

Looney Ricks Kiss has developed a regional, national and international practice that is based on corporate/office, banking/financial, healthcare, hospitality, and residential projects.

Office locations 
 Memphis, Tennessee
 Baton Rouge, Louisiana
 Celebration, Florida
 Dallas, Texas
 Little Rock, Arkansas
 New Orleans, Louisiana
 Princeton, New Jersey
 Philadelphia, Pennsylvania

References

External links 
 Official website

Architecture firms based in Tennessee
Companies based in Memphis, Tennessee